Zoran Rant (14 September 1904 – 12 February 1972) was a Yugoslav mechanical engineer, scientist and professor, associate member of SAZU. Rant invented the terms exergy and anergy.

References

Slovenian mechanical engineers
1904 births
1972 deaths
Members of the Slovenian Academy of Sciences and Arts
Yugoslav engineers